Ijaazat is an 1987 Indian Hindi-language musical romance film directed by Gulzar, based on a Bengali story, Jatugriha by Subodh Ghosh. Starring Rekha, Naseeruddin Shah and Anuradha Patel in leading roles, the film followed the story of couple who are separated and who accidentally meet in a railway station waiting room and discover some truths about their lives without each other. The film belongs to the art-house genre in India known as Parallel Cinema, and won two National Film Awards in the music category. The movie is based on the 1964 Bengali movie Jatugriha.

Plot 
The film is narrated as a present-day encounter between a divorced couple interwoven with flashbacks of several instances in their marriage. Mahender (Naseeruddin Shah) gets off a train and makes his way to the station waiting room just as it starts to rain heavily. His ex-wife, Sudha (Rekha), is already sitting in the waiting room but he fails to notice her. Upon seeing him, Sudha tries to hide from him but later they accidentally run into each other.

In the first of many flashbacks, Mahender meets Sudha's father figure (Shammi Kapoor) who urges him to consider keeping his vow of marrying Sudha. He had been engaged to Sudha for 5 years but always made an excuse to delay their wedding. Sudha's father figure has already fixed the wedding date and urges Mahender to show up. Mahender meets with Sudha to discuss his ongoing relationship with Maya (Anuradha Patel). Sudha asks Mahender to bring Maya to her (Sudha's) father figure and reveal his intention of marrying Maya instead. Mahender returns to his place for Maya but finds that she has left, leaving him a letter. Later, Mahender marries Sudha and has an amicable relationship with Maya simultaneously. Mahender often speaks with Maya as a friend but wishes to get over her and pursue a normal, married life with Sudha who remains wary of Maya's presence in her marriage. When Maya attempts suicide, Mahender feels guilty and starts spending more time with her. Sudha, not knowing about Maya's suicide attempt and believing that Mahender is being unfaithful to her, feels that her marriage was a mistake, and questions Mahender about his intentions. He then tells her strongly that he is going to bring Maya home to talk to her. Sudha is opposed to this but Mahender leaves nevertheless to bring Maya. However, Maya overhears Mahender and Sudha's arguments on the phone and she leaves before Mahender reaches to pick her up. Returning home without Maya, he finds that Sudha has left as well. Mahender, unable to bear the shock, suffers from a heart attack. Maya nurses him back to health while Sudha stays out of contact with Mahender and continues as a teacher in Panchgani. Later, Mahender feels the that it is time to bring Sudha back home. However, just then, he receives a letter from Sudha stating her intentions to abandon the marriage and cut off all contact with Mahender. After an argument with Mahender, Maya feels estranged at this abrupt change in their relationship and rides off on her motorcycle early in the dawn. Mahender rushes to follow her in his car to stop her. Maya's scarf gets entangled in the rear wheel of the motorcycle, which derails her off the vehicle and she dies from the injuries.

In the present day, after finding out about Mahender and Maya's fate, Sudha is deeply saddened. Just as Mahendra approaches her to ask about her life, her new husband (Shashi Kapoor) enters the room to pick her up. As Sudha's husband leaves the waiting room with her luggage, Mahender asks her to forgive him. She touches Mahender's feet as a plea for his forgiveness and for his permission (Ijaazat) for her to leave him—saying that this was something which she had not received the last time they had separated. Sudha's husband returns to see what is holding her up, recognises Mahender, and smiles at him. Sudha and her husband leave the waiting room and the platform while Mahender hangs back.

Cast 
 Rekha as Sudha
 Naseeruddin Shah as Mahendra
 Anuradha Patel as Maya
 Shammi Kapoor as Mahendra's Grandfather
 Shashi Kapoor as Sudha's Husband
 Dina Pathak as Principal
 Sulbha Deshpande as Sudha's Mother
 Ram Mohan
 Rita Rani Kaul
 Ashok Mehta
 Rajesh Bombaywala
 Ashfaq Ahmed
 Bhupinder Sharma
 Sunil Advani
 Monish Prem

Reception 
Filmfare wrote about the film, "One of Gulzar's most sensitive films, it also remains Rekha's most poignant performance as the possessive wife, who gives up her husband (Naseeruddin Shah) rather than share him with another woman (Anuradha Patel). Mera Kuch Saaman … can anyone not be moved by it?" According to Lalit Mohan Joshi, author of the book Bollywood: popular Indian cinema, Ijaazat "recreates the tingling sensation of a mature romance. It looks at an unusual male-female relationship, a subject less often broached in Hindi films." Joshi further notes that the film "exudes a sentimental feeling that seems more touching than the recent teenybopper romance stories." M.L. Dhawan from The Tribune, while documenting the famous Hindi films of 1987, commended Gulzar for giving "a mature treatment to the eternal love triangle of pati patni aur woh (husband, wife and the other woman)." He further noted Asha Bhosle for her "soul-stirring voice [which] left an impact" and the principal cast for their "emotion-loaded performances".

Awards 
35th National Film Awards:
 Best Lyrics – Gulzar for "Mera Kuchh Saamaan"
 Best Female Playback Singer – Asha Bhosle for "Mera Kuchh Saamaan"

 34th Filmfare Awards:

Won

 Best Lyricist – Gulzar for "Mera Kuch Saamaan"

Nominated

 Best Supporting Actress – Anuradha Patel

Music 
The film has four songs, all composed by R. D. Burman and sung by Asha Bhosle to lyrics penned by Gulzar. Burman was widely appreciated for his music in the film and the song "Mera Kuch Saamaan" was a big rage and achieved a classic status over time. Song won both writer and singer several acclodes with Asha Bhosle winning her second National Award for it. In an interview Asha Bhosle mentioned that when song "Mera Kuch Saamaan" was presented to R. D. Burman, he threw the song away calling it Times of India newspaper. Gulzar, who wrote the song and was also directing the movie, sat in a corner fearfully. She herself started humming the song which triggered the melody in Burman's mind and he composed the song in 15 minutes.

References

External links 
 

1987 films
1980s Hindi-language films
Films scored by R. D. Burman
Films based on short fiction
Films with screenplays by Gulzar
Hindi remakes of Bengali films
Films directed by Gulzar